Einsiedeln Abbey is a Roman Catholic monastery  administered by the  Benedictine Order in the village of Einsiedeln, Switzerland. The abbey is dedicated to Our Lady of the Hermits, in recognition of Meinrad of Einsiedeln, a hermit Catholic saint. The monastery  is not under the jurisdiction of a diocese or a bishop because it is a territorial abbey.

Pope Pius XI granted a pontifical decree of canonical coronation towards its venerated Marian image on 21 March 1934. The rite of coronation was executed by the Archbishop of Milan, Cardinal Alfredo Ildefonso Schuster, coinciding with the abbey’s millennium on 14 September 1934.

The abbey has been a major resting point for centuries for pilgrims travelling to Santiago de Compostela Cathedral in Spain on the Way of Saint James. The abbey operates a private high school along with a winery, sawmill, restaurant and other small businesses in order to support itself.

History 
The history of Einsiedeln Abbey starts with Meinrad of Einsiedeln. Born in 797 to an aristocratic German family, he was educated at the abbey school on Reichenau Island in what is today Germany.  Meinrad became a monk and was later ordained a priest. After gaining public attention for reportedly performing miracles, Meinrad established a hermitage in 829 in the Einsiedeln forest of Switzerland, searching for privacy.  He was murdered by two robbers in January 861.

Over the next 80 years, other hermits occupied Meinrad's hermitage. In 934 Eberhard, previously Provost of Strassburg, built the Einsiedeln abbey and church on the hermitage site, becoming its first abbot.  According to legend, the church was consecrated in 948 in person by Jesus Christ, the Four Evangelists, St. Peter, and St. Gregory the Great. Pope Leo VIII investigated and confirmed the miracle.  It was last ratified by Pope Pius VI in 1793, who confirmed the acts of all his predecessors.

In 965 Gregory, the third Abbot of Einsiedeln, was named a prince of the Holy Roman Empire by Emperor Otto I.  His successor abbots would hold that title until the dissolution of the empire in 1806. In 1039, Meinrad's relics were transferred from Reichenau Island to Einsiedeln for enshrinement.  In 1274, the abbey and its dependencies were incorporated into an independent principality by Rudolf I of Germany.  This gave the abbot political jurisdiction over the abbey lands.

During the early 16th century, the standards of discipline at Einsiedeln started to decline, but Ludovicus II, a monk of St. Gall who was Abbot of Einsiedeln from 1526 to 1544, restored a stricter observance.  The abbey remained unaffected by the Protestant Reformation in Switzerland.  Its leader, Huldrych Zwingli, had studied at the abbey for a period of time. Abbot Augustine I (1600–29) led the movement to create the Swiss Congregation of the Order of St. Benedict in 1602. Augustine established unrelaxed observance in the abbey and promoted a high standard of scholarship and learning amongst his monks.

The Einsiedeln abbey church was rebuilt by Abbot Maurus between 1704 and 1719.  In 1779, the abbey came under the control of France during its invasion of Italy, losing its status as an independent principality.  In 1854, during a period of unrest in Western Europe, the Einsiedeln leadership became afraid that the abbey would be suppressed or dissolved. They sent a group of monks to southern Indiana in the United States to minister to German immigrants and develop a possible place of refuge. The monks started a new foundation, now Saint Meinrad Archabbey in St. Meinrad, Indiana. The abbey celebrated the millennium of Meinrad of Einsiedeln in 1861.  The abbey started renovations in 1977 that were completed in 1997.

Pontifical coronation
Pope Pius XI granted a pontifical decree of canonical coronation towards its venerated Marian image on 21 March 1934. The rite of coronation was executed by the Archbishop of Milan, Cardinal Alfredo Ildefonso Schuster, coinciding with the abbey’s millennium on 14 September 1934.

Marian cult and veneration 
The religious pilgrimages which have never ceased since the days of Saint Meinrad, have tended to make Einsiedeln on a par with the Basilica della Santa Casa and Santiago de Compostela, serving as a major stopping point on the Way of Saint James leading there.  The statue of the Virgin Mary from the 15th century is enshrined within the chapel erected by Eberhard, and remains the venerated object of their cult and devotion. It is the subject of the earliest preserved print of pilgrimage, by the anonymous artisan Master E.S. in 1466. The chapel is located in the great abbey church.

September 14 and October 13 are the main days of pilgrimage.

 September 14 is the anniversary of the consecration of the original church in 948 AD. 
 October 13 is the anniversary of the translation of Meinrad's relics to Einsiedeln in 1039 AD.

Status today

Expansion to America 
Five monasteries were founded in the United States by monks from Einsiedeln Abbey:

 Saint Meinrad Archabbey in St. Meinrad, Indiana
 Subiaco Abbey in Logan County, Arkansas 
 St. Joseph Abbey in Saint Benedict, Louisiana
 Marmion Abbey in Aurora, Illinois
 Prince of Peace Abbey in Oceanside, California

One monastery, now closed, was San Jose Priory in Solola, Guatemala.

Monastery 
The library contains nearly 250,000 volumes and many priceless manuscripts. The library contains the Versus de scachis, the earliest mention of chess in Western literature.

The work of the monks is divided chiefly between prayer, work and study. At pilgrimage times the number of confessions heard is very large In 2013, the community numbered 60 monks. Attached to the abbey are a seminary and a college for about 360 pupils who are partially taught by the monks, who also provide spiritual direction for six convents of consecrated religious women.

The monastery complex, the abbey's library, archives and music collection are listed in the Swiss inventory of cultural property of national and regional significance as Class A objects of national importance.

School 
One of the abbey's apostolates is a school (Gymnasium) for the seventh to twelfth grades which has existed in its present form since 1848.  Its alumni include Gall Morel, Franz Fassbind, Philipp Etter, Hans Hürlimann and his son Thomas Hürlimann, Bruno Frick, and Anatole Taubman.

It is still a territorial abbey, meaning that it is located in a territory that is not part of any diocese which the abbot governs "as its proper pastor" (Canon 370, Codex Juris Canonici) with the same authority as a diocesan bishop.

Fahr Convent 

Located in separate cantons, Einsiedeln Abbey and Fahr Convent, a community of Benedictine nuns, form a double monastery, both under the authority of the male Abbot of Einsiedeln. The female prioress of Fahr cannot be elected to oversee both communities.

Dependencies

Ufenau 
Ufenau is a small island in Lake Zurich owned by Einsiedeln Abbey. Open to the general public, the island is home to a conservation area and tourist accommodation.

Endigen 
Endigen is a district in the town of Rapperswil-Jona, Switzerland owned by Einsiedeln Abbey.  It has been owned by the abbey since at least the 13th century. The Einsiedlerhaus, meaning "house of the Einsiedeln abbey" is an historic building in Endigen also owned by the abbey.

Cultural Heritage

Gallery

Bibliography
Moreau (Odile et Richard): D'Einsiedeln à la Salette au fil des siècles : avec les pėlerins comtois sur les pas de la Vierge Marie. L'Harmattan, Paris, 2012.

See also
Meinrad of Einsiedeln
Gall Morel
Johann Michael Feuchtmayer the Elder, Franz Joseph Feuchtmayer
Martin Marty (bishop)

References

External links

 
Klosterarchiv Einsiedeln (archives of the abbey) 

Christian monasteries established in the 10th century
Benedictine monasteries in Switzerland
History of Switzerland by location
Imperial abbeys
Cultural property of national significance in the canton of Schwyz
Einsiedeln
Buildings and structures in the canton of Schwyz
History of the canton of Schwyz
Double monasteries
Establishments in East Francia
Roman Catholic churches in Switzerland
10th-century establishments in Switzerland
10th-century churches
Religious buildings and structures completed in 934